Indu Sonali (born 27 September 1980) is an Indian film playback singer known for singing in item songs of Bhojpuri. She has sung for 300 Bhojpuri films and 50 music video albums and is considered as one of the top playback singers of the Bhojpuri film industry. Her music genre is primitive-acoustic folk with some traces of Indian classical music, ambient electronic and new age jazz fusion. Some of her most notable songs are "Lehriya Loot Re Raja" (Partigya), "Kahan Jaibe Raja Najariya" (Kaha Jaiba Raja), "Uthha Deb Lenga" (Damadji) and "Devar ho Daba Na Mor Karihaiya" (Rakhwala).



Early life and career
Indu Sonali was born on 7 November 1978 in Bhagalpur (Bihar).  She grew up and was educated in Bihar. She made her debut  as the playback singer in the Bhojpuri film Panditji Batai Na Biah Kab Hoi, for which Rajesh Gupta was the music director.

She is an ardent fan of Indian singing legend Lata Mangeshkar.

Sonali is a regular performer at electronic and new age jazz fusion oriented music festivals.

In 2016, Sonali recorded the solo devotional album Swaranjali with music director Damodar Raao which was released under music company Sai Recordds.

Selected songs

See also
 Bhojpuri cinema

References

External links
 लईकी से LOVE हो गईल - Rahani Barati Gail - Truck Driver 2 - Chintu - Bhojpuri Hit Songs 2016 new

1978 births
Living people
Indian women playback singers
Singers from Bihar
Women musicians from Bihar
People from Bhagalpur
21st-century Indian women singers
21st-century Indian singers
Bhojpuri playback singers